Białek may refer to:

Białek, Łódź Voivodeship
, a mountain in the Polish part of Śnieżnik Mountains
Białek (surname)